Chris Cuddington is an Australian animation director who worked at Hanna-Barbera Australia studios in Sydney during the 1970s and 1980s.

At Hanna-Barbera (Australia), he was Animation Director for the following TV series:

Clue Club (1976)
The Robonic Stooges (1977)
Wonder Wheels (1977)
The All New Popeye Hour (1978)
Dinky Dog (1978)
Drak Pack (1980)
The Kwicky Koala Show (1981)

Previously in 1972, he was the storyboard artist of Around the World in 80 Days.

References

External links
 
 

Australian animators
Living people
Hanna-Barbera people
Australian storyboard artists
Australian television directors
Australian film directors
Australian animated film directors
Year of birth missing (living people)